Kinu Malla was the fourth king of the Mallabhum. He ruled from 733 to 742 CE.

History
In 733 CE. Kinu Malla defeated the king of Indrahansh presently known as Indus and extended the kingdom.

References

Sources
 

Malla rulers
Kings of Mallabhum
8th-century Indian monarchs
Mallabhum